Beryozovo (Khanty: Сўмт вош, Sŭmt-voš; Mansi: Хāльӯс, Hāļūs) is an urban locality (an urban-type settlement) and the administrative center of Beryozovsky District of Khanty-Mansi Autonomous Okrug, Russia, located on the Ob River. Population:

Geography
It is situated on three hills on the left bank of the Severnaya Sosva River, at its junction with the Ob River. It has more than once suffered from conflagrations, including fires in 1719 and 1808.

History
Some ill-documented Russian trade took place in the area before the Russian conquest of Siberia. Beryozovo was founded in 1593 on the Severnaya Sosva route across the Ural Mountains to the fur-rich Mangazeya region. Ostyaks besieged the settlement in 1592, 1697, and 1608. It grew into a town of Beryozov in Tobolsk Governorate. By the late 17th century most trade had shifted south to Verkhoturye.

Prince Menshikov, the favorite of Peter the Great and of Catherine I, died here in exile in 1729. In 1730 Menshikov's enemy and rival, Alexey Grigoryevich Dolgorukov, was interned here with his family.

On 9 April 1740 the St. Petersburg-based French astronomer Joseph-Nicolas Delisle arrived in Beryozovo with the intention of observing the transit of Mercury due to take place on 22 April – but cloudy weather thwarted his plan. In his account of his expedition, Delisle mentions the name of the incumbent governor of Beryozovo: Fyodor Ivanov Schulginoff (Shulginov). During his sojourn in Beryozovo, where he lodged in the house of the hetman of the Cossacks ("la maison la plus distinguée de la Ville"), Delisle visited the church founded by Menschikoff (Menshikov), where the prince was subsequently buried. The town has a cathedral, near which lie buried Mary Menshikova (1711-1729, a daughter of Aleksandr Menshikov, who attempted to betroth her to tsar Peter II) and some of the Dolgorukovs.

In 1742 the Empress Yelizaveta Petrovna banished General Ostermann to Beryozov with his wife; he died there in 1747.
  
In the mid-18th century, gold was discovered at Beryozovo – Siberia's first important gold mine. Serfs and convicts worked the mine under primitive conditions and produced about 400 ounces a year (by the mid-19th century the gold sands further east were producing 600,000 ounces per year). In the 1960s, gas fields were discovered near its lower course, causing major population growth in the area. Transport is by river boat or by ice road.

After 1825, Beryozovo became a place of exile for many of the Decembrists. In the 20th century, the Tsarist regime also banished a number of revolutionaries to the area.

In 1907, on his way to exile in Obdorsk, Leon Trotsky escaped from Beryozovo on 12/13 February. It had taken him 33 days by train and horse to travel from St Petersburg. He mentions the exiling of Prince Menshikov.

Climate

Notes

External links
Beryozovo Museum (mostly in Russian with some English)

Urban-type settlements in Khanty-Mansi Autonomous Okrug
Beryozovsky Uyezd
Populated places on the Ob River